The 1981 Florida Gators football team represented the University of Florida during the 1981 NCAA Division I-A football season. The season was Charley Pell's third year as the head coach of the Florida Gators football team.  Pell's 1981 Florida Gators posted an overall record of 7–5 and a Southeastern Conference (SEC) record of 3–3, and tying for fourth place among ten SEC teams.

Schedule

Primary source: 2015 Florida Gators Football Media Guide.

Roster

References

Florida
Florida Gators football seasons
Florida Gators football